William Ian Nelson Crutchfield (July 12, 1911 — July 22, 1985), known as Nels Crutchfield, was a Canadian professional ice hockey player.

Born in Knowlton, Quebec, he played defence and centre for the McGill Redmen from 1930 to 1934 and was team captain from 1933 to 1934. He received a Bachelor of Commerce degree in 1934. He played 41 games in the 1934–35 season with the Montreal Canadiens, recording 5 goals and 5 assists, with another assist in two playoff games that year. His career was cut short after receiving a fractured skull in a car accident in September 1935.

He died in another car accident in 1985 in Huntsville, Ontario.

Crutchfield was inducted into the McGill University Sports Hall of Fame in 2001.

Career statistics

Regular season and playoffs

References

External links
 

1911 births
1985 deaths
Accidental deaths in Ontario
Anglophone Quebec people
Canadian ice hockey centres
Ice hockey people from Quebec
McGill Redmen ice hockey players
Montreal Canadiens players
People from Montérégie
Road incident deaths in Canada